Events in the year 1930 in Brazil.

Incumbents

Federal government 
 President: 
 (until 24 October) Washington Luís
 (from 24 October to 3 November) General Tasso Fragoso, Admiral Isaías de Noronha, General Mena Barreto
 (from 3 November) Getúlio Vargas (Head of the Provisional Government)
 Vice President: Fernando de Melo Viana (until 24 October), vacant after 24 October.

Governors 
 Alagoas: 
 till 10 October: Álvaro Correia Pais 
 10 October-14 October: Pedro Reginaldo Teixeira
 from 14 October: Hermilo de Freitas Blackbird
 Amazonas: 
 till 1 January: Ifigênio Ferreira de Sales
 1 January-24 October: Dorval Pires Porto 
 24 October-1 November: Government Junta
 1 November-20 November: Floriano da Silva Machado
 from 20 November: Álvaro Botelho Maia
 Bahia: Vital Soares, then Frederico Augusto Rodrigues da Costa, then Leopoldo Afrânio Bastos do Amaral
 Ceará: 
 till 8 October: José Carlos de Matos Peixoto
 from 8 October: Manuel Fernandes Távora
 Goiás:
 till 11 August: Alfredo Lopes de Morais
 11 August - 27 October: Humberto Martins Ribeiro
 27 - 30 October: Carlos Pinheiro Chagas
 30 October - 23 November: Goiana Governing Board of 1930
 from 23 November: Pedro Ludovico Teixeira
 Maranhão:
till 1 March: José Magalhães de Almeida
 1 March - 8 October: José Pires Sexto
 8 October - 14 November: Maranhão Governing Board of 1930
 15 November - 27 November: Luso Torres
 from 27 November: José Maria Perdigão
 Mato Grosso: Mário Correia da Costa, then Aníbal Benício de Toledo, then Sebastião Rabelo Leite, then Antonino Mena Gonçalves
 Minas Gerais: 
 until 7 September: Antônio Carlos Ribeiro de Andrada
 from 7 September: Olegário Maciel
 Pará:
 until 24 October: Eurico de Freitas Vale
 24 October - 26 October: Pará Governing Board of October 1930
 26 October - 28 October: Landry Sales Gonçalves
 28 October - 12 November: Pará Governing Board of 1930
 from 12 November: Joaquim de Magalhães Barata
 Paraíba: 
 until 26 July: João Pessoa Cavalcanti
 26 July - 4 October: Álvaro Pereira de Carvalho
 4 October -  26 November: José Américo de Almeida
 from 26 November: Antenor de França Navarro
 Paraná: 
 Afonso Camargo
 Mário Alves Monteiro Tourinho
 Pernambuco:
 until 28 May: Estácio Coimbra
 28 May - 6 October: Júlio Celso de Albuquerque Belo
 from 6 October: Carlos de Lima Cavalcanti
 Piauí:
 till 4 October: João de Deus Pires Leal
 from 4 October: Humberto de Areia Leão
 Rio Grande do Norte: 
 till 5 October: Juvenal Lamartine de Faria
 5-12 October: Military Governing Board, consisting of: Luis Tavares Guerreiro, Abelardo Torres da Silva Castro, and Julius Perouse Bridges
 from 12 October: Irenaeus Jofili
 Rio Grande do Sul: 
 till 9 October: Getúlio Dornelles Vargas 
 9-27 October: Osvaldo Euclides de Sousa Aranha
 27-28 October: Sinval Saldanha
 from 28 October: José Antônio Flores da Cunha
 Santa Catarina:
 São Paulo: 
 Sergipe:

Vice governors 
 Rio Grande do Norte:
 São Paulo:

Events 
1 March - A general election is held; Júlio Prestes of the Republican Party of São Paulo, receives 57.7% of the vote and is elected president. Vital Soares is elected vice-president, but never takes office.
26 July - The assassination of João Pessoa Cavalcânti de Albuquerque, governor of Paraíba, by João Duarte Dantas, stirs up a wave of bad feeling toward the federal government and the outgoing president Washington Luís, who is accused of bearing the "moral responsibility".
13 August - 1930 Curuçá River event: The area of Curuçá River near latitude 5° S and longitude 71.5° W experiences a meteoric air burst (also known as the Brazilian Tunguska event).
September - The state capital of Paraíba, formerly Parahyba, is renamed João Pessoa, in memory of its assassinated governor. 
3 October - Brazilian Revolution of 1930: 
24 October - Incumbent President Washington Luís is deposed.  A military junta, led by General Augusto Tasso Fragoso, temporarily takes control of the country.
1 November - Beginning of the Vargas Era: The ruling junta hands power and the presidential palace to Getúlio Vargas.
date unknown - The National Institute of Metrology Standardization and Industrial Quality (INMETRO) is founded.

Arts and culture

Films
As Armas, directed by Octavio Gabus Mendes

Births 
29 March - Lima Duarte, actor
21 April - Mário Covas, politician (died 2003)
24 April - José Sarney, 31st President of Brazil
7 June - Dolores Duran, Brazilian singer, songwriter (d. 1959)
28 June - Itamar Franco, 33rd President of Brazil (died 2011)
10 July - Jacques Klein, composer (died 1982)
22 August - Gylmar dos Santos Neves, footballer (died 2013)
28 August - Walmor Chagas, actor (died 2013)
16 August - Glauce Rocha, actress (died 1971)
2 September - Paulo Francis, journalist, novelist and critic (died 1997)
10 September - Ferreira Gullar (José Ribamar Ferreira), poet, playwright, essayist, art critic, and television writer
15 September - Odette Vidal de Oliveira, candidate for beatification (died 1939)
19 September - Ruth Cardoso, anthropologist, educator and public figure (died 2008)
29 October - Geraldo Del Rey, actor (died 1993)

Deaths 
26 July - João Pessoa Cavalcânti de Albuquerque, politician (born 1878; assassinated)

References

See also 
1930 in Brazilian football
List of Brazilian films of 1930

 
1930s in Brazil
Years of the 20th century in Brazil
Brazil
Brazil